Floresville High School is a public high school located in Floresville, Texas, United States and classified as a 5A school by the UIL.  It is part of the Floresville Independent School District located in west central Wilson County.  In 2015, the school was    "Met Standard" by the Texas Education Agency.

Athletics
The Floresville Tigers compete in these sports - 

Cross Country, Volleyball, Football, Basketball, Powerlifting, Soccer, Golf, Tennis, Track, Softball & Baseball

References

External links
 
 Floresville ISD
 Floresville Athletics

Schools in Wilson County, Texas
Public high schools in Texas